Marcelo Morales may refer to:
 Marcelo Morales (Argentine footballer)
 Marcelo Morales (Chilean footballer)